Filippo Carini (born 26 September 1990) is an Italian footballer who plays as a defender.

Club career
He made his Serie B debut for Modena on 28 August 2010 in a game against Ascoli.

In July 2018, he signed a one-year contract with Imolese.

On 29 July 2021, he joined Trento. On 30 January 2023, Carini's contract with Trento was terminated by mutual consent.

References

External links
 

1990 births
Living people
Sportspeople from the Metropolitan City of Bologna
Footballers from Emilia-Romagna
Italian footballers
Association football midfielders
Serie B players
Serie C players
Modena F.C. players
Pisa S.C. players
Calcio Padova players
U.S. Lecce players
L'Aquila Calcio 1927 players
Mantova 1911 players
Forlì F.C. players
Paganese Calcio 1926 players
Imolese Calcio 1919 players
A.C. Trento 1921 players